The Kentucky Indy 300 was an IndyCar Series race held at Kentucky Speedway in Sparta, Kentucky.

The IRL IndyCar Series debuted the race in 2000. In the 2002 race, Sarah Fisher won the pole position, the first such by a female driver in major open wheel competition.

During the 2002 Infiniti Pro Series practice, Jason Priestley suffered serious injuries after a practice crash.

Following the 2011 race, IndyCar failed to reach an agreement with the track in order to bring a race to the Speedway for the 2012 season.

Past winners

Firestone Indy Lights

References

External links
IndyCar.com race page
Champ Car Stats

 
Recurring sporting events established in 2000
2000 establishments in Kentucky
Recurring sporting events disestablished in 2011
2011 disestablishments in Kentucky